"When I Kiss You (I Hear Charlie Parker Playing)" is a electronic dance music song by American rock band Sparks, released in 1995 as the second single from their 16th album, Gratuitous Sax & Senseless Violins (1994). Written and produced by the Mael brothers, it also has a reference to American jazz saxophonist Charlie Parker. The song peaked at number 36 in the UK, number 61 in Germany and number 24 on the Billboard Hot Dance Club Play chart in the US. Originally it was released as "(When I Kiss You) I Hear Charlie Parker Playing", before being re-named to its present title.

Critical reception
Ned Raggett from AllMusic remarked that the song "finds Russell rapping (!)". In his weekly UK chart commentary, James Masterton said, "The new single is as bizarre as the title sounds, featuring a high-speed rapped verse that Neil Tennant would I'm sure give his right arm to have written, coupled with an impressively commercial chorus." Pan-European magazine Music & Media wrote, "We're living in the age of fast food Euro with one-liners serving as lyrics. Luckily the Sparks still use their imagination—through a tooth filling the lover here receives a jazz station." A reviewer from Music Week gave the song four out of five, describing it as "more delicious high camp drama from the kings of eccentric synth pop", and stated that former Suede guitarist Bernard Butler's Fashionable World Of Fashion Mix "should create a buzz." James Hamilton from the RM Dance Update viewed it as "Pet Shop Boys-ishly". In his review of Gratuitous Sax & Senseless Violins, Jonathan Bernstein from Spin felt "the sibs are at their most entertaining and least unbearable", opining that titles on tracks like "When I Kiss You (I Hear Charlie Parker Playing)" "are part of the reason for Spark's continued absence from American airwaves."

Music video
A music video was produced to promote the single, directed by English music video director Sophie Muller. It was later published on Sparks' official YouTube channel in June 2012. Muller had previously directed the video for "When Do I Get to Sing 'My Way'".

Track listing

Charts

External links
 Sparks on Discogs

References

 

1995 singles
1995 songs
Electronic songs
House music songs
Logic Records singles
Music videos directed by Sophie Muller
Songs written by Ron Mael
Songs written by Russell Mael
Sparks (band) songs